A plug computer is an external device, often configured for use in the home or office as a compact computer. The name is derived from the small configuration of such devices; they are often enclosed in an AC power plug or AC adapter.

Description 
Plug computers consist of a high-performance, low-power system-on-a-chip processor, with several I/O hardware ports (USB ports, Ethernet connectors, etc.). Most versions do not have provisions for connecting a display and are best suited as running media servers, back-up services, or file sharing and remote access functions; thus acting as a bridge between in-home protocols (such as Digital Living Network Alliance (DLNA) and Server Message Block (SMB)) and cloud-based services. There are, however, plug computer offerings that have analog VGA monitor and/or HDMI connectors, which, along with multiple USB ports, permit the use of a display, keyboard, and mouse, thus making them full-fledged, low-power alternatives to desktop and laptop computers. They typically run any of a number of Linux distributions.

Plug computers typically consume little power and are inexpensive.

History 
A number of other devices of this type began to appear at the 2009 Consumer Electronics Show.

 On January 6, 2009 CTERA Networks launched a device called CloudPlug that provides online backup at local disk speeds and overlays a file sharing service. The device also transforms any external USB hard drive into a network-attached storage device.
 On January 7, 2009,  Cloud Engines unveiled Pogoplug network access server.
 On January 8, 2009, Axentra announced availability of their HipServ platform.
 On February 23, 2009, Marvell Technology Group announced its plans to build a mini-industry around plug computers.
 On August 19, 2009, CodeLathe announced availability of their TonidoPlug network access server.
 On November 13, 2009 QuadAxis launched its plug computing device product line and development platform, featuring the QuadPlug and QuadPC and running QuadMix, a modified Linux.
 On January 5, 2010, Iomega announced their iConnect network access server.
 On January 7, 2010 Pbxnsip launched its plug computing device the sipJack running pbxnsip: an IP Communications platform.

See also 
 Classes of computers
 Computer appliance
 CuBox, a plug computer
 GuruPlug, a plug computer
 DreamPlug, a plug computer
 FreedomBox, an operating system
 Personal web server
 Print server
 Raspberry Pi, a single-board computer
 SheevaPlug, a plug computer
 Stick PC, a computer attached to and powered by a USB or HDMI plug

References

External links
 

Cloud computing
Classes of computers
Cloud clients
Home servers
Server appliance